Soul Sister is the eighth studio album by American singer Aretha Franklin, released in 1966 by Columbia Records.

Track listing
Side One
"Until You Were Gone" (Joy Byers) (3:00)
"You Made Me Love You (I Didn't Want to Do It)" (James V. Monaco, Joseph McCarthy) (2:32)
"Follow Your Heart" (Van McCoy, Belford Hendricks) (2:24)
"Ol' Man River" (Oscar Hammerstein II, Jerome Kern) (4:05)
"Sweet Bitter Love" (Van McCoy) (2:57)
"A Mother's Love" (Cliff Owens) (2:30)
Side Two
"Swanee" (Irving Caesar, George Gershwin) (2:24)
"(No, No) I'm Losing You" (Joy Byers) (3:08)
"Take a Look" (Clyde Otis) (2:40)
"Can't You Just See Me" (Belford Hendricks) (2:00)
"Cry Like a Baby" (Jo Armstead, Nickolas Ashford, Valerie Simpson) (2:09)

Personnel
Belford Hendricks - arrangements, conductor (tracks: A5, A6, B3)
Robert Mersey - arrangements, conductor (tracks: A1, A2, A4, B1, B2)
Bob Johnston - producer (tracks: A1, A2, B1, B2)
Clyde Otis - producer (tracks: A3, A5, A6, B3 to B5)
Henry Parker - cover photography

References

Aretha Franklin albums
1966 albums
Albums arranged by Belford Hendricks
Albums produced by Bob Johnston
Columbia Records albums